Holm Pinder (born 21 March 1971) is a German former footballer and current manager.

References

External links

1971 births
Living people
German footballers
German football managers
1. FC Lokomotive Leipzig players
FC Sachsen Leipzig players
FSV Zwickau players
2. Bundesliga players
Association football central defenders
Footballers from Leipzig